The flag of the Ukrainian Insurgent Army, also known as the red-and-black flag of Ukraine, is a flag previously used by the Ukrainian Insurgent Army (UPA) and the Banderite Organization of Ukrainian Nationalists (OUN), and now used by various Ukrainian nationalist organizations and parties, including UNA-UNSO, Right Sector, Congress of Ukrainian Nationalists and others. The flag consists of two colors: red and black. The black color symbolizes the black soil of the Ukrainian land, and the red color symbolizes the blood of Ukrainians shed for it.

History 
The revolutionary wing of the OUN, which was also called the OUN (b), or the Banderites, because it was headed by Stepan Bandera, sought to develop its own symbolism in order to differ from the OUN (m) of Andriy Melnyk, which used the blue flag of the OUN and the coat of arms with a golden trident with a sword. The OUN (b) approved its official red and black emblem, and at the II Great Gathering of the OUN in April 1941 decided to abandon the trident with a sword and use only "the national Trident of Volodymyr the Great in the form introduced by the Central Rada" and "a separate organizational flag of black and red colors. The way of life and the mandatory proportions will be adopted by a separate commission." However, due to the outbreak of the Great Patriotic War, this commission never met.

The flag received a lot of usage after the Independence of Ukraine in 1991, where it became a common symbol of Ukrainian nationalists. It has also been frequently used as a military symbol and unofficial war flag during the Russo-Ukrainian War.

Usage
 In Ilya Repin's painting "Reply of the Zaporozhian Cossacks", Repin hid blue-yellow and red-black flags on spears in the background above the heads of the Cossacks. The artist's consultant during the writing of this painting was the famous historian of the Ukrainian Cossacks Dmytro Yavornytsky. It was from the exhibits of his collection that Repin depicted most of the ammunition, weapons, and other Cossack paraphernalia, including the flag.
 A ribbon imitating the flag of the OUN(b) is present on the flag of Ivano-Frankivsk Oblast. 
 On March 30, 2018, the Verkhovna Rada of Ukraine registered a bill "On the Flag of National Dignity", which provides for the installation of a flag on government buildings, schools, institutes, enterprises nine times a year during the celebration of certain memorable dates in order to honor "heroes who made a significant contribution to the struggle for independence of Ukraine". This bill also provides for the technical justification and rules for the installation of the flag.
 On May 24, 2020, near the building of the Dnipropetrovsk Regional State Administration, during the "Stop Revenge" action, employees of a contractor fenced off a place near the Regional State Administration and began preparatory work to install a 12-meter flagpole for the red-black flag. The head of the Dnipropetrovsk regional council Svyatoslav Oliynyk called these actions a provocation. On May 28, 2020, four veterans of the Donbas war solemnly raised the flag as a symbol of the struggle of the Ukrainian people for independence at an action initiated by the headquarters of the "Movement of Resistance to Surrender". The flagpole with the flag was installed on the basis of Agreement No. 116/20М dated 15 May 2020, between the KP "City Improvement Control Department" of the Dnipro City Council and the "Infoprostir" Social Technologies Center public organization.

References 

Ukrainian Insurgent Army
Flags of Ukraine